Jason Raubenheimer (born 4 January 1999) is a South African cricketer. He made his first-class debut on 13 February 2020, for Border in the 2019–20 CSA 3-Day Provincial Cup. He made his List A debut on 16 February 2020, for Border in the 2019–20 CSA Provincial One-Day Challenge. He made his Twenty20 debut on 10 February 2022, for Knights in the 2021–22 CSA T20 Challenge.

References

External links
 

1999 births
Living people
South African cricketers
Border cricketers
Knights cricketers
Place of birth missing (living people)